Sri Kanya,  Kanya Bharathi and mononymously known as Kanya, is an Indian actress known for her work in Malayalam and Tamil television soap operas. She made her debut with Ente Sooryaputhrikku and later went on to act in several Malayalam films. She is popularly known for her roles in TV series namely Manasi,Chandanamazha, Deivam Thandha Veedu, Valli, Nandhini and Amma.

Television

Other TV Shows

Filmography

References

External links
 

Year of birth missing (living people)
Living people
Indian actresses
Actresses in Malayalam television
Actresses in Tamil television
Actresses in Malayalam cinema
Actresses in Kannada television